The Sony α7 IV (model ILCE-7M4) is a full-frame mirrorless interchangeable-lens camera manufactured by Sony. It was announced on 21 October 2021 as the successor to the Sony α7 III. Featuring a new 34.1MP (approx. total). back-illuminated CMOS sensor inside, latest BIONZ XR™ image processor, Real-Time Eye AF tracking and 4K 60p video with Super 35mm mode

Features 
The camera features several advancements from its predecessor the Sony α7 III, also incorporating some pro features from the high-end Sony α1.

 33 MP (approx. effective) full-frame BSI-CMOS sensor
 759 Phase Detection AF Points and 425 Contrast Detection AF points
 Featuring Real-time Continuous Eye-AF Tracking for Human, Animal & Bird
 Improved UI Layout (New menu structure) compared to its predecessor
 Closed mechanical shutter function (previously this feature debuted in α1) when the camera is turned off
 Flip 3-inch LCD vari-angle touchscreen with 1.04 million dots 
 3.69-million dot resolution, 120fps refresh rate EVF 
 5-axis optical in-body image stabilisation with a 5.5 stops of shake reduction
 10 fps continuous shooting (mechanical or silent)
 Live stream through the USB Type-C connector in 4K(15fps) and FHD(60fps)
 4K 60p recording in Super 35mm mode and up to 4K 30p recording with 7K oversampling is available in full-frame mode
 15 stop dynamic range
 Slow & Quick motion features up to 120fps
 4K oversampled video from 7K resolution in 30p video mode
 Battery life with NP-FZ100 is rated at approx. 580 images using LCD screen and approx. 520 images using EVF
 Native ISO range is 100-51,200 and extended ISO range is 50-204,800
 10-bit HEIF image option (using .heic container)
 Continuous burst shoot 10 fps with Compressed Raw and 6 fps with Uncompressed Raw
 Weather sealed, magnesium alloy body
 No built-in flash
 Multi Interface (Mi Shoe) shoe with Sony's unique metal shoe
 3.68 million-dot (approx.) OLED Quad-VGA viewfinder is (1.6 times the resolution of the Alpha 7 III viewfinder)
 Supports 4 different video file formats (XAVC HS 4K, XAVC S-I 4K, XAVC S 4K, XAVC S HD)
 Dual SD Card Slots, CFExpress Type A Slot (only SLOT 1)

Dynamic Range and Color Independent Testing 
Independent testing by Gerald Undone using Imatest software and a Xyla color range chart demonstrates a dynamic range of 12.8 stops of light, which is approximately 1/3 of a stop better than the Sony A7s iii and approximately the same as the Sony a1.  It color matches fairly well with the Sony A7s iii and Sony a1, with the Sony A7s iii  leaning a bit green, the Sony a1 a bit magenta, and this camera between the two (tested using DCS Labs -SW - CDM 28R - v15.2 A3 color chart) and with individual white balancing, the colors are very similar.

Video formats 
Camera is using in house developed AVC Video Format called XAVC. The format is compressed format achieving balanced quality and file size. Recording in color depth of 10-bits and 4:2:2 chroma subsampling is possible with Sony's XAVC codec.

 All Intra-frame system that compresses each frame individually to achieve best quality.
 When recording 4K movies in the XAVC HS format is an optional which is using a HEVC codec (H.265) and has high compression efficiency. 
 The camera can record movies with higher image quality than XAVC S movies but the same data volume. 
 Camera can record in "Long GOP" codec (H.264) compression which is compressing multiple frames to reduce file size.

Video resolutions and modes 
PAL modes and NTSC modes has different Recording Frame Rates and Record Settings.

Available Slow and Quick motion shooting modes in PAL and NTSC Mode:

See also 

 Comparison of Sony α7 cameras
 List of Sony E-mount lenses
 Exmor R

References

External links 
 DPreview - Full Camera Review
 PCMag Review 

α7 III
Full-frame mirrorless interchangeable lens cameras